Huaxia Bank Co., Ltd. is a publicly traded commercial bank in China. It is based in Beijing and was founded in 1992. Germany's Deutsche Bank holds 19.99% of the bank's shares as of 2010.  In December 2015, it was announced that People's Insurance Company of China will acquire Deutsche Bank's entire stake in the bank for RMB23-25.7 billion.

As of end of June 2012, Hua Xia Bank has in place a "hub-and-spoke" network of 33 tier-1 branches, 23 tier-2 branches, 12 cross-city sub-branches and 437 outlets in 68 major cities, and a settlement network of more than 1000 correspondent banks located in 320 cities across 110 countries and regions covering major global trade zones. In 2012 it ranked 97th by asset according to The Banker's Top 1000 World Banks ranking published in July. In 2011, it ranked 306th among Top 500 Chinese Enterprises, 96th among Top 500 Chinese Service Enterprises and 67th among Top 200 Chinese Enterprise Performance.

References

External links 
  

Companies in the CSI 100 Index
Companies based in Beijing
Banks of China
Government-owned companies of China
Banks established in 1992
Companies listed on the Shanghai Stock Exchange
Chinese brands